Chivalry of a Failed Knight (also known as A Tale of Worst One) is an anime series adapted from the light novels of the same title by Riku Misora and Won. Produced by Silver Link and Nexus and directed by Shin Ōnuma, the series adapts the first three volumes of the light novels. Focusing on the adventures of Hagun Academy's F-Rank Blazer Ikki Kurogane, he is challenged to a mock duel with A-Rank Blazer Stella Vermillion after he walks in on her changing in his room. After the duel, they eventually become roommates and training partners, intent on competing as Hagun's representatives in the annual Seven Star Sword Art Festival.

The series initially ran from October 3 through December 19, 2015 on AT-X in Japan  and was released on DVD and Blu-ray in six compilations, each containing two episodes, by Media Factory and Frontier Works between December 25, 2015, and May 25, 2016. In September 2015, Sentai Filmworks licensed the series for an English-language digital and home media release in North America. The series was simulcast exclusively on Hulu as it aired in Japan. It was released on DVD and Blu-ray in North America on June 13, 2017.

The series uses two pieces of theme music. The opening theme, titled , is performed by Mikio Sakai and also serves as the ending theme for the first episode. The ending theme, used from episode 2 onwards, is  performed by the rock band Ali Project. The original score for the series is composed by Kōtarō Nakagawa.

Episode list

Home releases

Japanese release

Kadokawa Media Factory, in partnership with Frontier Works, distributed the episodes in six volumes in DVD and Blu-Ray format across Japan.

DVD

Blu-ray

References

Lists of anime episodes